Bubbles is a 2D action game developed by Williams Electronics and released arcades in 1982. The player uses a joystick to control a bubble in a kitchen sink. The object is to progress through levels by cleaning the sink while avoiding enemies.

It was developed by John Kotlarik and Python Anghelo. Kotlarik wanted to create a non-violent game inspired by Pac-Man. Anghelo designed the game's artwork and scenario as well as a special plastic cabinet that saw limited use. The game was later released as a web-based version and on home consoles as part of arcade compilations.

Gameplay 

Bubbles is an action game where the player controls a soap bubble from a top-down perspective. The object is to clean a kitchen sink by maneuvering over ants, crumbs, and grease spots to absorb them before they slide into the drain. As the bubble absorbs more objects, it grows in size, eventually acquiring first eyes and then a smiling mouth. At the same time, sponges and scrub brushes slowly move around the sink, cleaning it on their own in competition with the player. Touching either of these enemies costs a player one life unless the bubble is large enough to have a complete face. In this case, the enemy will be knocked away and the bubble will shrink. Sponges and brushes can be knocked into the drain for bonus points, eliminating them from play. Two other enemies in the sink are stationary razor blades and roaches that crawl out of the drain. Contact with a blade is always fatal, while the bubble can safely touch the roach only while carrying a broom, which will kill the roach with one hit. The broom can be acquired by running over a cleaning lady who appears in the sink from time to time.

A level ends when all of the point-scoring objects are gone - either lost down the drain, cleaned by sponges/brushes, eaten by roaches, or absorbed by the bubble. At this point, if the bubble is large enough to have a complete face, the player moves on to the next level; otherwise, one life is lost and the level must be replayed. In addition, whenever the bubble has a face, the drain flashes green, giving the player a chance to enter it and skip the next level. Entering the drain while the bubble is too small costs one life.

Development 
The game uses monaural sound and raster graphics on a 19 inch CRT monitor. The initial concept was conceived by John Kotlarik, who aimed to create a non-violent game. Inspired by Pac-Man, he envisioned similar gameplay in an open playing field rather than in a maze. Python Anghelo furthered the concept by creating artwork and a scenario. Kotlarik designed the protagonist to have fluid movement like it was traveling on a slick surface. The control scheme allows the digital input to operate similar to an analogue one. He programmed the bubble to accelerate in the direction the joystick is held. Once the joystick returns to its neutral position, the bubble will coast as the velocity slowly decreases.

Anghelo designed the artwork for the wooden cabinets as well as a new cylindrical, plastic cabinet. This plastic model was dubbed the "Duramold" unit. Gary Berge, a mechanical engineer, created the new cabinets with a rotational molding process. Though the plastic cabinets were durable, they would shrink over time, sometimes causing the device to become inoperable. Williams Electronics used this cabinet for only two other games, Blaster and Sinistar.

Reception 
Author John Sellers listed it among the weirder arcade games released. Clare Edgeley of Computer and Video Games echoed similar statements. She criticized the game, stating that the constant blue background was dull and the game lacked longevity. Retro Gamers Darran Jones described the game as engrossing and obscure. He also expressed disappointment that few people remember it. Bubbles arcade cabinets have varying degrees of rarity. The cocktail and cabaret are the rarest, followed by the plastic and upright versions; the plastic models are more valuable among collectors.

Legacy 
In 2000, a web-based version of Bubbles, along with nine other classic arcade games, was published on Shockwave.com. Four years later, Midway Games launched a website featuring the Shockwave versions. Williams Electronics included Bubbles in several of its arcade compilations: the 1996 Williams Arcade's Greatest Hits, the 2000 Midway's Greatest Arcade Hits (Dreamcast version only), the 2003 Midway Arcade Treasures, and the 2012 Midway Arcade Origins.  It is also an included title on the Midway Legacy Edition Arcade1Up cabinet.

See also

 Williams Arcade's Greatest Hits

Notes

References

External links
 Bubbles at Arcade History

1982 video games
Arcade video games
Action video games
Williams video games
Video games developed in the United States
Multiplayer and single-player video games
Video games about ants